Municipal elections were held in Venezuela on 9 December 2018, aimed at choosing only the 2459 municipality councillors of Venezuela.

Background
Following the 2018 Venezuelan presidential election, municipal elections were quickly organized throughout Venezuela. The National Electoral Council proposed the election date of 9 December 2018, which in turn was approved by the Constituent National Assembly on 13 July 2018.

Conduct 
Many voting centers were seen empty due to low participation. Members of the state-run CLAP were ordered to participate in the elections with the government offering food products to those who were involved.

Results
Official results showed that only 27.4% of eligible voters participated in the election compared to 47.3% in 2017.

References 

2018 in Venezuela
Venezuela
Municipal elections in Venezuela